Energy Saving Modules (ESM) reduce the electricity consumption (kWh) and maximum demand (kW) of air conditioning and refrigeration compressors. The concept was developed in Australia in 1983 by Abbotly Technologies and is now distributed by Smartcool Systems Inc. The system works in conjunction with existing HVAC controls ensuring that compressors work at maximum efficiency, while maintaining desired temperature levels. By preventing over-cycling, known as ‘Compressor Optimisation' consumption of electricity is cut by between 15% and 25%.

Method of operation 
Conventional controls, including Building and Energy Management Systems and state-of-the-art refrigeration controls, often operate only on reaching pre-programmed static values to switch compressors off and on or adjust capacity. When the measured medium is within the dead band, the system and controllers remain idle.

The "energy saving module" is a computer that records the switching values of the primary controller and also measures the 'rate of change' of both the rise and fall of temperatures during the operating cycle. With this data the "energy saving module" computes a reference heat load to match the cooling capacity and then calculates operating parameters. This calculation is used to minimize compressor operation within the switching values, with a resultant reduction in refrigeration and air conditioning compressor run time and reduced electricity consumption. By dynamically measuring the heat load and adjusting the control differential in proportion to the cooling demand it's possible to dynamically control the cycle rate of the compressors. This is achieved while maintaining the desiredoperating temperature.

See also

Energy Conservation
Greenhouse Gases
Green Technologies
Ecowizard

References 
 Testing Conducted by: Los Angeles Department of Water & Power (LADWP) Location: Notrica's Market, Bellwood, California Date: March 1998. 
 Testing Conducted by: Oak Ridge National Laboratory (U.S. Department of Energy) Location: ASDA / Wal-Mart Super Center, Sheffield, United Kingdom Date: December 2004

External links 
 

Energy conservation
Energy economics